Tepee Creek is a stream in the U.S. state of South Dakota.

Tepee Creek's name comes from the Sioux Indians of the area, for the fact they lived in tepees.

See also
List of rivers of South Dakota

References

Rivers of Meade County, South Dakota
Rivers of Miner County, South Dakota
Rivers of South Dakota